Lost, Lonely and Vicious is a 1958 American film directed by Frank Myers.

Plot

Cast 
Ken Clayton as Johnnie Dennis
Barbara Wilson as Helen Preacher
Lilyan Chauvin as Tanya Pernaud
Richard Gilden as Walt
Carol Nugent as Pinkie
Sandra Giles as Darlene
William Quimby as Pig
Allen Fife as Buddy
Frank Stallworth as Mr. Preacher
Clint Quigley as Reporter
Jim Reppert

External links 

1958 films
American black-and-white films
1958 drama films
American drama films
Films directed by Frank Myers
1950s English-language films
1950s American films